Southwick may refer to:

People
 Southwick (surname)

Places

India
 Southwick, Ooty, a suburb of Ooty town in the state of Tamil Nadu

England
 Southwick, Hampshire (pronounced suth-ick), a village
 Southwick, Northamptonshire (pronounced suth-ick), a small village
 Southwick, a hamlet in the parish of Mark, Somerset
 Southwick, Sunderland, a suburb of the City of Sunderland, Tyne and Wear
 Southwick, West Sussex, a town in the Adur District
 Southwick (electoral division), a West Sussex County Council constituency
 Southwick Ship Canal
 Southwick, Wiltshire, a village near Trowbridge

Scotland
 Southwick, Dumfries and Galloway, see Colvend and Southwick, former parish in Dumfries and Galloway

United States
 Southwick, Massachusetts, a town in Hampden County

Other uses
 Southwick angle in radiography